Shahmar-e Baba Morad (also Romanized as Shāhmār-e Bābā Morād; also known as Shāhmār and Sheykh Morad-e Tofangchī) is a village in Gurani Rural District, Gahvareh District, Dalahu County, Kermanshah Province, Iran. At the 2006 census, its population was 121, in 25 families.

References 

Populated places in Dalahu County